Bauers is a surname. Notable people with the surname include:

People
Jake Bauers (born 1995), American baseball player
Jason Bauers, drummer in American mathcore band Psyopus
Nate Bauers (born 1982), American lacrosse player
Russ Bauers (1914–1995), American baseball player

Fictional characters
Joe Bauers, fictional character in 2006 film, Idiocracy

See also
Bauer (surname)
Bowers (surname)